Asachi (Romanian pronunciation: [aˈsaki]) is a Romanian surname that may refer to
Elena Asachi (1789–1877), Romanian pianist, singer and composer, wife of Gheorghe
Gheorghe Asachi (1788–1869), Moldavian-Romanian prose writer, poet, painter, historian, dramatist and translator
Gheorghe Asachi Technical University of Iași

See also
Asahi (disambiguation)

Romanian-language surnames